A timeline is a graphical representation of a chronological sequence of events.

Timeline or time line may also refer to:

Computing and technology
 TimeLine, project management software marketed by Symantec
 Timeline, a social media profile format

Arts and media

Films
 Timeline (2003 film), a film based on Michael Crichton's 1999 novel of the same name 
 Timeline (2014 film), a romantic-comedy-drama Thai film

Games 
Time Line (2002), a boardgame containing time travel elements, designed by Lloyd Krassner for Warp Spawn Games
 Timeline (video game), a 2000 video game published by Eidos Interactive and based on the eponymous 1999 Michael Crichton novel
 Timeline (1985), a two-player chess variant designed by George Marino for Geo Games
 TimeLine (2003), 54-card boardgame designed by James Ernest for Cheapass Games

Music
 Time Line (AD album), 1984
 Time Lines, a 2005 album by Andrew Hill
 Time-Line, a 1983 album by Renaissance
 Timeline (Ayreon album), 2008
 Timeline (Richard Marx album), 2000
 Time Line (Ralph Towner album), 2005
 Timeline (The Vision Bleak album), 2016
 Timeline (Yellowjackets album), 2011
 Timeline, a member of the electro funk music group, Underground Resistance

Television
 Timeline (TV series), a 1989 educational PBS TV show
 Timeline, a BBC Two Scotland TV programme, the successor to Scotland 2016
Timeline, a 2014 gameshow hosted by Brian Conley
 The Timeline, a documentary series developed by NFL Films

Other uses in arts and media
 Timeline (novel), a 1999 science fiction novel by Michael Crichton
 Transformers: Timelines, a collectible set of toys and fiction by Hasbro

See also
 Alternate history
 Chronology
 List of games containing time travel
 List of timelines
 Timecode
 Timestream
 Timetable (disambiguation)